Trengganu Street is a street located in Chinatown within the Outram Planning Area in Singapore.

The road links Pagoda Street and Sago Street, and is intersected by Temple Street and Smith Street. A section of Trengganu Street from Pagoda Street to Smith Street was converted to a pedestrian mall in 1997, with the remaining section of the street and Sago Street also converted into a pedestrian mall in 2003 and now forms the heart of the tourist belt in Singapore's Chinatown.

References
Victor R Savage, Brenda S A Yeoh (2004), Toponymics - A Study of Singapore Street Names, Eastern University Press, 
National Heritage Board (2006), Discover Singapore - Heritage Trails,

External links

Uniquely Singapore website

Chinatown, Singapore
Outram, Singapore
Pedestrian malls in Singapore
Roads in Singapore